CableHell was an independent consumer lobby group designed by customers of Virgin Media (previously known as NTL/Telewest for Cable TV services in the UK) to discuss issues and create a community where people could submit their own views of the company, and opinions on how to improve products or services. The forum membership included a number of Virgin Media employees who helped out customers of Virgin Media and provided a source of official information.

CableHell was occasionally cited by global news sources such as the BBC, The Times and The Guardian as well as other online publications.

Started in April 2002, CableHell was one of the UK's larger ex-ntl: focused customer support forums in the UK. There were numerous forums available for members, for each different type of service which Virgin Media provides; such as Digital TV, Telephone, Internet and Mobile. There were also alternative forums for other topics and providers, as well as a number of support and FAQ guides available.

The forum was previously known as Ntl:hell however with the re-branding of NTL/Telewest, the name changed to reflect this.

Employee Hacking
An employee of ntl was alleged to have attempted to hack the forum on New Year's Eve 2002, and send abusive messages to their members. The hacker was traced back to Ntl offices and the company later carried out a formal internal investigation . Ntl terminated the employment of the individual and apologised to the forum .

Closure 
At 10:34pm on March 16, 2009, the site was taken offline by its owner  without advance notice or explanation. At that time it had 387,625 posts, and 34,332 registered members.

On February 23, 2010, Cable Forum announced the closure of Cable Hell by its domain owner, and its acquisition by Cable Forum, with the old Cable Hell Domain now redirecting to the Cable Forum site.  The former Cable Hell moderating team began encouraging Cable Hell members to join a new 'temporary' site on Facebook.   In a statement, Cable Forum said it wished to encourage Cable Hell members to become members of Cable Forum. 

The CableHell team members recently re-launched as

See also
 Virgin Media
 Nthellworld

External links
 http://www.cablehell.co.uk (formally known as ntlhell.co.uk )
 Virgin Media - Official Site
 The Guardian - Going online for gripes of wrath
 The Guardian - City diary
 BBC - Do online rants get results?
 BBC - Will 'fourplay' be the next big thing?
 The Times - Agenda
 The Times - Let's call the whole thing off
 The Register - ntl: suspends employee over ntl:hell hack
 The Register - ntl: sacks hacker for gross misconduct
 The Register - AntiCap lobby group calls for BB freedom
 The Register - ntlhell protest site defends libel allegations
 WebUser Magazine - Customers hold NTL to ransom
 Interhell

Internet forums
Consumer rights organizations
Consumer organisations in the United Kingdom
Virgin Media

References